is a Japanese politician of the Liberal Democratic Party, a member of the House of Representatives in the Diet (national legislature). A native of Tokyo, she attended Nihon University as an undergraduate and received MBA from Keio University. She was elected to the House of Representatives for the first time in 2005.

See also 
 Koizumi Children

References

External links 
 Official website in Japanese.

1962 births
Living people
People from Tokyo
Nihon University alumni
Keio University alumni
Koizumi Children
Female members of the House of Representatives (Japan)
Members of the House of Representatives (Japan)
Liberal Democratic Party (Japan) politicians
21st-century Japanese women politicians